The Doctors is a 2016 South Korean medical drama starring Kim Rae-won and Park Shin-hye. It aired every Mondays and Tuesdays at 22:00 (KST) on SBS from June 20 to August 23, 2016 for 20 episodes.

The drama was a hit and averaged 18.40% in audience ratings. In particular, Park's character as a troubled teenager turned charismatic doctor was very popular among the audiences for her action scenes and straightforward lines.

Synopsis
Yoo Hye-jung (Park Shin-hye) was a headstrong girl in high school with a prickly, gangster personality. Due to her many childhood scars, Hye-jung keeps her heart closed towards other people. However, she changes after meeting her mentor Hong Ji-hong (Kim Rae-won), who plays a key role in transforming her life from a "hopeless" delinquent to a compassionate doctor. They part ways due to a report of their close relationship, which was reported by a fellow student but subsequently meet again after 13 years, when Yoo Hye-jung had become a successful doctor.

Cast

Main 
Kim Rae-won as Hong Ji-hong
Gil Jung-woo as child Hong Ji-hong
Lomon as teen Hong Ji-hong
Hong Ji-hong, whose birth name was Lee Ji-hong before his adoption, is a hard working man who lost his parents at a young age in a car accident. He was adopted later on in his life, graduated from a prestigious medical school and started out as a doctor. However, a medical accident while he was working as a surgeon made him step back and he restarts his career as a biology teacher. He cares for teenagers, especially his students since he had a rough life as a teenager. This makes him interested in the life of rebellious Yoo Hye-jung when she decides to turn over a new leaf and actually work hard in school. It is after being separated from her that he realizes she is the one he has fallen in love with. When he and Yoo Hye-jung cross paths 13 years later, he who is now a neurosurgeon confesses his feelings for her.

Park Shin-hye as Yoo Hye-jung
Kal So-won as child Yoo Hye-jung
Yoo Hye-jung is a successful neurosurgeon. She was a delinquent in high school, known for her wayward personality. Having gone through a tough childhood, she found it hard to trust anyone. The only person she trusted and loved is her grandmother, who never failed to support her. However, her thoughts about others changed after meeting teacher Hong Ji-hong, who helped her find her goal in life.

Yoon Kyun-sang as Jung Yoon-do
Jung Yoon-do is a neurosurgeon as well as a visiting staff who is from a wealthy family. He is not good with rough situations in society. However, he knows how to handle his work with strictness. He finds himself attracted to Yoo Hye-jung, who is very different from him.

Lee Sung-kyung as Jin Seo-woo
Jin Seo-woo is a neurosurgeon and also friends-turned-enemies with Yoo Hye-jung. She liked Hong Ji-Hong, but seeing the growing relationship between Hong Ji-hong and Yoo Hye-jung, she causes trouble for them. This in turn caused them to part ways. Forgetting about Hong, she starts liking Jung Yoon-do but again feels inferior to Hye Jung due to Yoon-do's attraction towards Hye-jung. Eventually, she reconciled with Hye-jung and restored their friendship. Additionally, in the end, she fell for Young-gook and became his girlfriend.

Supporting

People around Hong Ji-hong
 Lee Ho-jae as Hong Doo-sik – Ji-hong's adoptive father and Gookil Hospital's chairman
 Yoo Da-in as Jo In-joo – General Surgery's specialist

People around Yoo Hye-jung
 Kim Young-ae as Kang Mal-soon (cameo) – Hye-jung's grandmother
 Jung Hae-kyun as Yoo Min-ho – Hye-jung and Yoo-na's natural father
 Park Ji-a as Lee Ga-jin – Hye-jung's stepmother and Yoo-na's mother
 Han Bo-bae as Yoo Yoo-na – Hye-jung's younger half-sister
 Ji Soo as Kim Soo-cheol (Guest: Ep. 1, 2, 3, 5, 7–8) – Hye-jung's friend
 Moon Ji-in as Cheon Soon-hee – Hye-jung's best friend and Seo-woo friend.

People around Jin Seo-woo
  as Jin Sung-jong – Seo-woo's grandfather and Gookil Hospital's vice president
 Um Hyo-sup as Jin Myung-hoon – Seo-woo's father and Gookil Hospital's director
 Yoon Hae-young as Yoon Ji-young – Seo-woo's mother

People of Gookil Hospital
 Jang Hyun-sung as Kim Tae-ho – Gookil Hospital's deputy director and Head of Neurosurgery
  as Kang Kyung-joon – Neurosurgery's 4th year resident doctor
 Baek Sung-hyun as Pi Young-gook – Neurosurgery's 3rd year resident doctor and Seo-woo's friend who had a long-time crush on Seo-woo herself
 Jo Hyun-sik as Ahn Joong-dae – Neurosurgery's 2nd year resident doctor
 Kim Min-seok as Choi Kang-soo – Neurosurgery's 1st year resident doctor 
  as Baek Ho-min – Head of General Surgery and Hospital's public relations chief
 Lee Seon-ho as Jung Pa-ran – General Surgery's teacher, Ji-hong's friend and Yoon-do's uncle
 Choi Sung-jae as Hwangbo Tae-yang – General Surgery's 1st year resident doctor
 Pyo Ye-jin as Hyun Soo-jin – 5th year nurse
 Ji Yi-soo as Yoo Byul – 2nd year nurse

Extended
  as Namyang Girls' High School's teacher 
  as Cheon Soon-hee's father, Namyang Girls' High School's director
  as club DJ
  as Choi Mi-ra
  as Kim Soo-cheol's friend
 Lee Jin-kwon as Kim Soo-cheol's friend
 Lee Bom-so-ri as So-ri
 Son Jang-woo as pregnant patient's son
  as patient passenger on airplane
 Im Ji-kyu as gunman	
 Jin Seon-kyu as Kim Chi-hyun
  as Nam Hae
 Choi Jeong-hoo as Nam Dal
  as parliamentarian Na Min-soo
 Yeo Hoe-hyun as Choi Young-soo (Kang soo's younger brother) (Episodes 17–18)
  as lawyer

Special appearances
 Lee Ki-woo as Gong Byung-doo – gang boss (Episodes 1, 3–6, 9)
 Lee Jun-hyeok as boss's subordinate
  as Oh Young-mi
 Lim Ji-yeon as Lee Soo-jeong – youngest gold medalist in archery (Episode 7–8)
 Han Hye-jin as Jo Soo-ji (Episodes 11–12)
  as Ahn Sung-soo – Jo Soo-ji's stalker/assailant (Episodes 11–12)
 Namkoong Min as Nam Ba-ram – Nam Hae and Nam Dal's father (Episodes 13–15)
 Lee Sang-yeob as Kim Woo-jin – Lee Hee-young's fiancé (Episodes 15, 16, 18, 20)

Production 
The Doctors was based on the screenplay by Ha Myung-hee which is one of the winners in Broadcasting Content Promotion Foundation (BCPF)'s 3rd Find the Desert's Shooting Star Screenplay Competition, held in 2010. Then titled as Female Thug Hye-jung, the series was in talks to air on KBS 2TV's Monday-Tuesday prime time slot in 2015 following the end of Healer, however, it did not push through.  (My Love from the Star, You're All Surrounded) was supposed to produce the drama, while PD  (Smile Again, Dream High 2) was in talks to direct.

First script reading took place on April 28, 2016 at SBS Ilsan Production Studios in Goyang, Gyeonggi Province, South Korea.

The series reunited Park Shin-hye and Baek Sung-hyun, who previously played the younger versions of Han Jung-suh and Cha Song-joo, respectively, in the 2003 hit drama, Stairway to Heaven. It also reunited Park Shin-hye and Yoon Kyun-sang who previously worked together in the 2014 hit drama, Pinocchio.

In the United States, the drama was aired in the Los Angeles DMA free, over-the-air on Asian American-oriented TV channel, LA 18 KSCI-TV (channel 18) with English subtitles, Monday through Tuesday at 9:00pm, from July 18 to September 20, 2016.

Original soundtrack

Track listings

Charted songs

Ratings

Awards and nominations

Remake
The Turkish drama  ("Heartbeat") is an adaptation of Doctors, starring Öykü Karayel and Gökhan Alkan. It was aired from June 2017 to January 2018.

Notes

References

External links
  
 
 

Seoul Broadcasting System television dramas
2016 South Korean television series debuts
2016 South Korean television series endings
South Korean medical television series
South Korean romance television series
South Korean television series remade in other languages
Television series by Pan Entertainment